Julius Selle-Larsson (born March 13, 1992) is a Swedish ice hockey player. He is currently playing Kalmar HC of the Hockeyettan

He played two games for HV71 in the Elitserien during the 2011–12 Elitserien season.

References

External links

1992 births
HV71 players
Kristianstads IK players
Living people
Swedish ice hockey right wingers
People from Lidköping Municipality
Sportspeople from Västra Götaland County